Mashangva Genius Zenith (born 23 February 1986 in Manipur) is an Indian footballer.

Career

United Sikkim
Zenith moved to United Sikkim F.C. in the summer of 2012 after playing for Shillong Lajong. Zenith made his debut for United Sikkim on 20 September 2012 against Pune F.C. during the 2012 Indian Federation Cup.

Career statistics

Club
Statistics accurate as of 12 May 2013

References

Indian footballers
1986 births
Living people
Footballers from Manipur
I-League players
Churchill Brothers FC Goa players
Mohun Bagan AC players
Shillong Lajong FC players
United Sikkim F.C. players
Association football midfielders